Air Conditioner is a 2020 Angolan film directed by Fradique (Mário Bastos). The film had its worldpremiere at International Film Festival Rotterdam and premiered June 6, 2020 in Luanda at the We Are One online film festival. The film was shot in 2020 in Luanda by Generation 80. When the air-conditioners mysteriously start to fall in the city of Luanda, Matacedo (security guard) and Zezinha (housemaid) have the mission of retrieving their boss's air conditioner. The screenplay is co-written by Ery Claver.

References

External link 
 
 Review at The Guardian

2020 films
Angolan drama films
2020s Portuguese-language films